Kesk may refer to:

Organisations 
 Confederation of Public Workers' Unions
 Finnish Centre Party
 Estonian Centre Party

Places in Iran 
 Gesk, a village in North Khorasan Province
 Kasgak, a village in Razavi Khorasan Province